Tapan Acharya (born 2 August 1981) is an Indian actor, writer, producer and director, popular in Marathi and Konkani cinema. He is best known for the Konkani movies Martin and Aleesha. He also worked as a state youth icon for the Election Commission of India to increase voter awareness in Goa.

Personal

Early life
Tapan Acharya was born to a Goud Saraswat Brahmin family in the small village of Loliem-Polem towards the southern boundary of the Indian state of Goa. He attended school in his village at Shri Damodar Vidhalaya, and attended higher education at Shri Damodar College of Commerce and Economics, Margao, South Goa. While pursuing a degree in law from G.R Kare Law College he also completed a postgraduate diploma in management studies. He is credited with having knowledge in astrology, numerology, Vedas, and mythology. He holds various diplomas and certificates in gemology, astrology and Vedic studies.

Career
Although early in life he wanted to be behind the camera, he was first thrust into the public eye as host of the TV show Chum Chum Chanana on Doordarshan Goa. He went on to star in his first film, Aleesha, in 2004, which was released at First IFFI in Goa. It was well received, winning the National Award for Best Feature Film in the Regional Category.

Acting

 It's My Life (Konkani) (2003)
 Aleesha (2004)
 Padri (2005) 
 Mareparyant Phashi (2009)
 Martin (2017)

Producer
 Janma (2011)

Television show
 Chum Chum Chanana (DD Goa) (2001)

Other work
Tapan Acharya is an appointed youth icon for the state of Goa by the Election Commission of India to increase awareness in voters.

References

1981 births
Living people
Marathi male actors
Male actors in Marathi cinema
Male actors from Maharashtra
Male actors in Marathi theatre
Male actors from Goa